Ngah Ibrahim  was a Malay headman who succeeded his father Long Jaafar as headman and administrator of the district of Larut upon the death of his father in 1857. By the time of Sultan Ismail Mu'abbiddin Riayat Shah of Perak, Ngah Ibrahim had quarrelled with Raja Muda Abdullah II, the son of the former sultan who had been passed over by the Royal Council in favour of Ismail. Abdullah sought to engineer a situation where the British would recognise him as Sultan and sought the services and recognition of Ngah Ibrahim. In return he appointed Ngah Ibrahim as Orang Kaya Mantri of Larut in 1858. The two of them had a falling-out and embroiled miners in the Larut area in their dispute which eventually resulted in intervention by the British, the treaties at Pangkor for the cessation of hostilities between the miners, the recognition of Abdullah as Sultan of Perak and the appointment of a British Resident whose advice must be asked and acted upon on all questions except those touching Malay religion and custom.

See also 
 Chung Keng Quee

Notes 

Ibrahim
Ibrahim
Ibrahim
Ibrahim
Ibrahim
Ibrahim